Scavengers in the Matrix is a various artists compilation album released on June 10, 1994 by If It Moves....

Reception
Aiding & Abetting called described Scavengers in the Matrix as being "truly experimental dance music" and "like most compilations, production values and music quality do vary, but as usual, Chase has brought a load of great stuff together, weeding out the chaff."

Track listing

Personnel
Adapted from the Scavengers in the Matrix liner notes.

 Chase – compiling, design
 Benn Dunn – illustrations
 Trevor Henthorn – mastering

Release history

References

External links 
 Scavengers in the Matrix at Discogs (list of releases)

1994 compilation albums
Electro-industrial compilation albums
Re-Constriction Records compilation albums